Marisa Marie Viggiano (born February 5, 1997) is an American soccer player who plays as a midfielder for Houston Dash in the NWSL.

Early life 
Coming out of high school, Viggiano ranked as the No. 25 recruit in the nation and the No. 5 recruit in the Great Lakes Region by TopDrawerSoccer.com. She played three seasons of club soccer for Michigan Hawks ECNL.

Northwestern Wildcats 
Viggiano attended Northwestern University from 2015 to 2018 where she got a degree in communication studies. She was named to the Big Ten All Freshman Team after starting every game, a streak that continued through 83 games into her senior year, the third longest streak in program history. She also ranks second all-time in program assists with 20.

In the off-seasons, Viggiano played with hometown Women's Premier Soccer League side Motor City FC.

Professional career

Orlando Pride 
Viggiano was selected in the fourth round (30th overall) of the 2019 NWSL College Draft by Orlando Pride. Following preseason, she was officially signed to the team's senior roster on April 10. She made her professional debut on April 27, coming on as a substitute for Dani Weatherholt against Utah Royals FC. Viggiano scored her first professional goal on July 20, 2019, the game-winner in a 1–0 win over Sky Blue FC. It was nominated for Goal of the Week.

With the 2020 season disrupted by the COVID-19 pandemic, Orlando's scheduled was limited to four games in total as part of the Fall Series. Viggiano finished as the team's top scorer with two goals in four appearances. Ahead of the 2021 season she signed a new two-year contract with the option for an additional year.

Houston Dash 
On January 28, 2022, Houston Dash acquired Viggiano in a trade with Orlando in exchange for Megan Oyster, $30,000 in allocation money and a third-round pick in the 2023 NWSL Draft.

International career 
Viggiano has previously been called into camp with the United States U16 and U20 youth national teams. In August 2019, Viggiano was selected as part of the U23 squad to contest the Nordic Tournament against Norway, England and Sweden.

Personal life 
Marisa's younger sister, Natalie, is also a soccer player currently at the OL Reign. Her father, Tom Viggiano, played and coached ice hockey at Kent State University and was inducted into the KSU Athletic Hall of Fame in 2013.

Career statistics

Club 
.

References

External links 
 
 Marisa Viggiano NWSL profile
 Marisa Viggiano Orlando Pride profile
 Marisa Viggiano Northwestern profile

1997 births
Living people
American women's soccer players
Northwestern Wildcats women's soccer players
Orlando Pride draft picks
Orlando Pride players
National Women's Soccer League players
Soccer players from Michigan
People from Troy, Michigan
Women's association football midfielders
Houston Dash players